"Tabloid Junkie" is a song performed by American recording artist Michael Jackson. The song appeared   as the eleventh track on Jackson's ninth studio album, HIStory: Past, Present and Future, Book I, which was released in 1995 as a two-disc set. The song was written, composed, and produced by Michael Jackson, Jimmy Jam (James Harris III) and Terry Lewis.

The song received generally positive reviews from music critics. "Tabloid Junkie" is a funk rock song, with lyrics that pertain to media bias and negative coverage of rumors about Jackson and his personal life, similar to previous songs recorded by Jackson. "Tabloid Junkie" is the seventh song on HIStory to be aimed at the media.

Background 
Similarly to "Leave Me Alone" (1987), "Why You Wanna Trip on Me" (1991) and numerous fellow HIStory tracks, "Tabloid Junkie", co-written by Jackson, shows Jackson's dissatisfaction with the media, particularly the tabloids, because of the bias and negative media coverage of false rumors and the 1993 child sexual abuse accusations made against him. Ever since the late 1980s, Jackson and the press did not have a good relationship. In 1986, the tabloids ran a story claiming that Jackson slept in a hyperbaric oxygen chamber to slow the aging process, with a picture of him lying down in a glass box; Jackson stated that the story was untrue. When Jackson bought the pet chimpanzee Bubbles, the media viewed it as evidence of Jackson's increasing detachment from reality.

It was reported that Jackson had offered to buy the bones of Joseph "The Elephant Man" Merrick; Jackson stated that the story was false. These stories inspired the derogatory nickname "Wacko Jacko", which Jackson acquired the following year, and would come to despise. Jackson stopped leaking untrue stories to the press, so the media began making up their own. In 1989, Jackson released the song and music video "Leave Me Alone", a song about his victimization at the hands of the press. The video shows Jackson poking fun at both the press and himself. In the video, there are newspapers with bizarre headlines, Jackson dancing with the bones of "The Elephant Man", and an animated nose with a scalpel chasing it across the screen.

In August 1993, the relationship between Jackson and the press reached a boiling point when he was accused of child sexual abuse. Although never charged with a crime, Jackson was subject to intense media scrutiny while the criminal investigation took place. Complaints about the coverage included the media using sensational headlines to draw in readers and viewers when the content itself did not support the headline, accepting leaked material from the police investigation and of Jackson's alleged criminal activity in return for money, a lack of objectivity and using headlines that strongly implied Jackson's guilt. At the time, Jackson said of the media coverage, "I will say I am particularly upset by the handling of the matter by the incredible, terrible mass media. At every opportunity, the media has dissected and manipulated these allegations to reach their own conclusions." Jackson began taking painkillers, Valium, Xanax and Ativan to deal with the stress of the allegations made against him. When he left the United States to go into rehabilitation, the media showed him little sympathy.

Composition 
"Tabloid Junkie" is a funk rock song. Throughout the song, Jackson sings in a quick-voice, which some music critics viewed as Jackson "not singing" but "harrumphing".  It is a plea to the public to not believe everything in the tabloids; and the lyrics are about media bias and sensational journalism about Jackson and in general. This can be heard in lyrics such as, "Just because you read it in the magazine or see it on the TV screen don't make it factual".

Jackson uses the song to criticize journalists, commenting "with your pen you torture men", describing how he was affected by the media coverage about him, and "speculate to break the one you hate", describing how reporters used sensational writing to mislead people and cast him in a negative view.

"Tabloid Junkie" is played in the key of E♭ minor and in common time signature. It has heavy beats throughout with Jackson beatboxing throughout. Jackson's voice range is from C♭4 to D♭5. The songs tempo is moderate and its metronome is 111 beats per minute.

Reception 
"Tabloid Junkie" received primarily positive reviews from contemporary music critics. James Hunter, a writer for Rolling Stone, described "Tabloid Junkie", as well as "Scream", another track from the album, as being "two adventurous Jam and Lewis thumpers" that "work completely", commenting that "Jackson's slippery voice is caught in mammoth funk-rock constructions". Hunter noted that the "choruses of 'Tabloid Junkie' in particular sing out with quick-voiced warnings about the failings of media truth." Robert Christgau, a music critic who gave the album ** Honorable Mention, listed "Tabloid Junkie" as being one out of two of the album's highlights.  Jim Farber, of the New York Daily News, commented that "Tabloid Junkie" sounded "like virtual satires" of the "beat-heavy sound devised" by Jam and Lewis in the 1980s.

David Browne, of Entertainment Weekly, noted that "Tabloid Junkie" comes as "close to transcendence as anywhere on the album" and described the chorus, "Just because you read it in the magazine or see it on the TV screen don't make it factual",  as Jackson's "grabbiest, most driven refrain in years." Although Browne praised the song, he commented, "The rest of the song, however, is mucked up with fake tabloid-TV snippets about his 'life,' and on the verses Jackson's delivery is so terse (he's not singing, he's harrumphing) that his lyrics are all but obliterated. Handed a golden opportunity, he throws it all away — but then, it wouldn't be the first time." Deepika Reedy, of The Daily Collegian, described the "rust in songs" like "Tabloid Junkie" as having a "raw aspect" that Jackson "hasn't approached since a near-miss with 'Billie Jean'." Patrick Macdonald, of The Seattle Times, noted that "Tabloid Junkie" was a "disingenuous attack on sensational news stories" about Jackson, remarked that most of stories were "planted" by Jackson himself.

Track listing 
 Album track:
 "Tabloid Junkie" - 4:32
 "Tabloid Junkie/2 Bad (ONE Version)" Studio/Remixed version, which is used in "Michael Jackson ONE" show in Las Vegas - Length unknown

Personnel
 Produced by Michael Jackson, Jimmy Jam and Terry Lewis
 Recorded and mixed by Bruce Swedien
 Michael Jackson – lead and backing vocals, vocal and rhythmic arrangements
 Jimmy Jam and Terry Lewis – synthesizers and keyboards

References

Further reading 

1995 songs
Funk rock songs
Michael Jackson songs
Songs written by Michael Jackson
Songs written by Jimmy Jam and Terry Lewis
Song recordings produced by Michael Jackson
Song recordings produced by Jimmy Jam and Terry Lewis
Songs about the media
Works about tabloid journalism